A Lego clone is a line or brand of children's construction blocks which is mechanically compatible with Lego brand blocks, but is produced by another manufacturer. The blocks were originally patented by The Lego Group in 1961 as "toy building bricks", and the company has since remained dominant in this market. Some competitors have moved to take advantage of Lego brand recognition by advertising their own products as compatible with Lego, with statements such as "compatible with leading building bricks".

The last underlying patents of the brick design expired in 1978, opening the field to rivals.

Legal challenges
At least two of the largest clone manufacturers have been challenged in court by Lego. The lawsuits have been mostly unsuccessful, for courts have generally found the functional design of the basic brick to be a matter of patent rather than trademark law, and all relevant Lego patents have expired.

Lego itself originally copied their bricks from British psychologist and inventor Hilary Page in the late 1940s.

Lego and Tyco Industries fought in US courts over Tyco's line of interlocking bricks in the 1980s with Tyco prevailing. On August 31, 1987, the US District Court ruled that Tyco could continue making Super Blocks, its Lego clone bricks, but ordered Tyco to stop using the Lego trademark and not to state that they were "Lego, but only cheaper". In Lego's Hong Kong suit against Tyco Super Blocks, Lego received an injunction forcing Tyco to stop cloning Lego brick designed after 1973. Tyco was also being sued at the time by Lego in Austria, Italy and Canada.

Lego sued the Canadian company Mega Bloks on the grounds that its use of the "studs and tubes" interlocking brick system was a violation of trademarks held by Lego. On November 17, 2005, the Supreme Court of Canada upheld Mega Bloks' right to continue selling the product in Canada. A similar decision was reached by the European Union's Court of First Instance on November 12, 2008, upholding an EU regulatory agency's reversal of opinion following an objection by Mega Bloks against a trademark awarded to Lego in 1999. Mega Bloks won a case at the EU's top court in 2010 against Lego's trademark registration of a red toy building brick. On September 14, 2010, the European Court of Justice ruled that the 8-peg design of the original Lego brick "merely performs a technical function [and] cannot be registered as a trademark."

The English company Best-Lock Construction Toys sued Lego in German courts in 2004 and 2009. The German Federal Court denied Lego trademark protection for the shape of its bricks in the latter case.

The Lego Group did score a success in 2002, when its Swiss subsidiary Interlego AG sued the Tianjin CoCo Toy Co., Ltd. company for copyright infringement. A claims court found many CoCo sets to be infringing; CoCo was ordered to cease manufacture of the infringing sets, publish a formal apology in the Beijing Daily, and pay a small fee in damages to Interlego. On appeal, the Beijing High People's Court upheld the trial court's ruling.

In 2000, Lego filed a three-dimensional trademark for its mini-figures, which Best Lock had duplicated since 1998. In 2012, Best Lock sued to get the trademark revoked. On June 16, 2015, European Court of Justice upheld Lego's figure trademark. Lego had in 2009 filed its copyright claims into a U.S. Customs database that led to the seizure of Best-Lock shipments coming in from Asia. In October 2011, Lego filed in US District Court in Hartford filed against Best-Lock over the mini-figure trademark.

In 2011, Lego sued Guangdong Jumbo Grand Plastic Moulding Industrial over its BanBao brand's copycat packaging. The two companies settled their case out of court with Guangdong agreeing to create unique packaging and a new figure, ToBees.

In 2016, Lego announced that it would be taking legal action against the Chinese company Guangdong Loongon, which manufactures the brand Lepin, for selling exact replicas of existing Lego products (including box-art).

In 2019 Lego sued Lakeshore Learning Materials for violating its minifigure trademark.

In 2020 Lego was successful in blocking Zuru from selling its own version of minifigures, the court finding that Zuru infringed upon Lego's trademark.

Brands

K'Nex sets have included compatible bricks since 2008.
Ramagon, by Discovery Toys, has some panels with compatible studs

See also
Interlego AG v Tyco Industries Inc

References

clone
Construction toys
Copyright infringement